The 5th Tank Battalion "M.O. Chiamenti" is an inactive tank battalion of the Italian Army based in Tauriano in Friuli Venezia Giulia. Originally the battalion, like all Italian tank units, was part of the infantry, but since 1 June 1999 it is part of the cavalry. Operationally the battalion was last assigned to the Armored Brigade "Ariete".

History 
The battalion was formed during the 1975 army reform: on 30 September 1975 the 32nd Tank Regiment was disbanded and the next day its XXIII Bersaglieri Battalion became the 23rd Bersaglieri Battalion "Castel di Borgo", while its III Tank Battalion became the 3rd Tank Battalion "M.O. Galas" and the V Tank Battalion became the 5th Tank Battalion "M.O. Chiamenti". As the flag and traditions of the 32nd Tank Regiment were assigned to the 3rd Galas the 5th Chiamenti was granted a new flag on 12 November 1976 by decree 846 of the President of the Italian Republic Giovanni Leone. The battalion received the traditions of the V Tank Battalion "M", which had been formed by the 32nd Tank Infantry Regiment on 11 November 1940 and fought in the early stages of the Western Desert Campaign and was destroyed by the British XIII Corps in the Battle of Beda Fomm on 7–8 February 1941. For its service and sacrifice the V Tank Battalion "M" was awarded a Silver Medal of Military Valour, which was transferred from the flag of the 32nd Tank Regiment to the newly created flag of the 5th Tank Battalion "M.O. Chiamenti".

For its conduct and work after the 1976 Friuli earthquake the battalion was awarded a Silver Medal of Army Valour, which was affixed to the battalion's flag and added to the battalion's coat of arms.

Tank and armored battalions created during the 1975 army reform were all named for officers, soldiers and partisans, who were posthumously awarded Italy's highest military honor the Gold Medal of Military Valour for heroism during World War II. The 5th Tank Battalion's name commemorated 32nd Tank Infantry Regiment Maresciallo Carlo Chiamenti, who had served in the IV Tank Battalion "M" and was killed in action on 15 April 1941 during the Axis Invasion of Yugoslavia. Equipped with M60A1 Patton main battle tanks the battalion joined the Armored Brigade "Mameli", whose headquarters had been formed from the 32nd Tank Regiment's headquarters.

After the end of the Cold War the Italian Army began to draw down its forces and the "Mameli" was the first brigade disband. On 1 April 1991 the brigade was deactivated along with some of its subordinate units, while the 3rd and 5th tank battalions, and 23rd Bersaglieri Battalion joined the 132nd Armored Brigade "Ariete". On 25 August 1992 the 5th Tank Battalion "M.O. Chiamenti" disbanded and its personnel entered the "Galas" battalion, which entered the reformed 32nd Tank Regiment the next day.

See also 
 132nd Armored Brigade "Ariete"

References

Tank Battalions of Italy